The Mangalorean Catholic Cuisine is the cuisine of the Mangalorean Catholic community.

Mangalorean Catholics are Roman Catholics from Mangalore and the rest of the historic South Canara area by the southwestern coast of Carnataca, India. Most Mangalorean Catholics share ancestry with present-day Goan Catholics, they had migrated to South Canara from Portuguese Goa between 1560 and 1763 following their Christianisation in Goa. The migration continued during the Portuguese Inquisition in Goa and Bombay-Bassein and the Mahratta Invasion of Goa and Bombay. The culture of Mangalorean Catholics is a blend of Mangalorean and Goan cultures. After migration, they adopted some aspects the local Mangalorean culture but retained many elements of their Konkani ways of life.

Non-vegetarian cuisine

Their curry uses a lot of coconut and curry leaves while ginger, garlic and chilli are also used. Mangalorean Catholic cuisine has distinct Portuguese influence as can be seen in Laitao, the famous pork roast served as the Pièce de résistance at wedding dinners, and Pork Sorpotel. Fabled cooks like Davidam or Alicebai were called in to help with the repast. Mangalorean Catholics mix pork blood and other parts in most of their pork delicacies as can be seen from Pork Bafat, Cabidela and Kalleze un Kiti (heart and intestines). Sanna–Dukra Maas (Sanna – idli fluffed with toddy or yeast; Dukra Maas – Pork) and Unde–Dukra Maas (Unde – leavened bread; Dukra Maas – Pork) are popular dishes. Chicken Indaz is also popular. The traditional Rosachi kadi (Ros Curry), a fish curry made with ros (coconut milk) is quite popular and is served during the Ros (anointing) ceremony that is held 1 or 2 days before a Mangalorean Catholic wedding. Their fish curry especially their Fish Roe Curry, is known for its taste in the whole of coastal India while fried fish in their style is well known. The Sheveo Roce and Pathal Bakri (a variant of Kori Rotti) are dry rice flakes dipped in chicken gravy dishes.

Vegetarian cuisine

The "Balthazaar Chutney" is a popular condiment. The dish originated when Balthazaar, a Mangalorean Catholic nobleman, was taken prisoner by Tippu Sultan in 1784 during the Captivity of Mangalorean Catholics at Seringapatam. Unable to stomach the indifferent camp food, he offered to make a chutney for the captured Mangalorean Catholics.  

The Pollu, a type of Sambhar with Galmbi (powdered dried fish) or Kambulmas (Dried Tuna) is popular. The traditional Fode is a popular pickle. Thail Piao, which means literally vegetables dumped with oil and onions and left to boil on the fire wood is quite popular. Karamb (Cucumber salad) and Foka (Lady’s finger combined with cashewnuts). The Appam (rice balls) and Panpole (a type of pancake) are popular delicacies made of soaked rice, water and salt. The Thath Bakri is a banana leaf rice dish made with ground red boiled rice mixed with raw scraped coconut and roasted on a tava on a banana leaf. The Mitais, Mandas, Ushae, Pitae and Mani are well known sweet dishes.

Kuswar is a term often used to mention a set of unique Christmas goodies which are part of the cuisine of the Mangalorean Catholic community There are as many as 22 different traditional recipes that form this distinct flavour of Christmas celebration in Mangalore. Neuries are puffs stuffed with plums, nuts, and fried theel (sesame) and sugar. Kidyo or Kulkuls are curly concoctions dipped in sugar treacle, pathekas are savoury of green nandarkai bananas, theel laddus and jaw snapping Golios. Macaroons is what Manglore is famous for and the subtle flavored rose cookies are a hot favorite. But it is the Rich Plum Cake which takes the better part of a week to make. Candied fruit, plums, currents, raisins are dexterously cut and soaked in rum. Flour sieved and gently warmed in the sun.  Nuts shelled and chopped and the whole family comes together to make the cake.  Jobs are allotted, one to whip up the eggs, while another creams the butter and sugar, cake tins are lined, and a strong pair of arms requisitioned to do the final mixing and stirring.

Patrode or Pathrade, a dish of colocasia leaves stuffed with rice, dal, jaggery, coconut, and spices is also popular. The Mangalorean Catholic version of this steamed delicacy is a slight variation on the Tuluva recipe.  More spicy, it is fried in Meet Mirsang (salt and chilli),  a red chilli masala, which is a popular condiment used to flavour Mangalorean Catholic dishes.

Notes

External links
Mangalorean Catholic Cuisine by RoseMary Albuquerque Pai from The Summer Sands Online newspaper
Mangalorean Cuisine by MyNation easy Recipes and Dishes
 www.oneplateplease.com by Jason Castelino, a Mangalorean foodie on the quest of unearthing the history and hidden gems of Mangalorean Cuisine
 by Rovena's Spices & Aromas, Mangalorean & Traditional food
 by Hungry Mangy - A home recipe collection submitted by members of the Hungry mangy group. 

Catholic cuisine
Mangalorean cuisine